Dmitri Borisovich Karsakov (born 29 December 1971) is a Russian former football midfielder.

International
He played in 6 matches for the USSR U-20 team at the 1991 U-20 World Cup.

European club competitions
With PFC CSKA Moscow.

 UEFA Champions League 1992–93: 10 games, 3 goals.
 UEFA Cup 1996–97: 1 game, 1 goal.

References

External links
 
 

1971 births
Footballers from Moscow
Living people
Soviet footballers
Soviet Union youth international footballers
Russian footballers
Russia under-21 international footballers
Association football midfielders
Soviet Top League players
Russian Premier League players
K League 1 players
Russian expatriate sportspeople in South Korea
Russian expatriate footballers
Expatriate footballers in South Korea
Expatriate footballers in Belarus
FC Torpedo Moscow players
FC Torpedo-2 players
PFC CSKA Moscow players
FC KAMAZ Naberezhnye Chelny players
FC Dynamo Moscow players
Jeju United FC players
FC Slavia Mozyr players
FC Gomel players
FC FShM Torpedo Moscow players
FC Nosta Novotroitsk players